Carlos Acosta (born 2 April 1908, date of death unknown) was a Mexican sports shooter. He competed in the 25 m pistol event at the 1936 Summer Olympics.

References

External links

1908 births
Year of death missing
Mexican male sport shooters
Olympic shooters of Mexico
Shooters at the 1936 Summer Olympics
Place of birth missing